Johannes Wieland (born 20 November 1967 in Berlin, Germany) is a choreographer, teacher and dancer.

Biography
Johannes Wieland received his early dance training under Ellys Gregor in Berlin, the ballet academy of the Deutsche Oper Berlin, with John Neumeier at the Hamburg State Opera and the Amsterdam School of the Arts where he earned his BFA. His dance career took him back to Germany, the State Theatre of Brunswick, Germany, followed by the Berlin State Opera. Here he worked with numerous guest choreographers, among them Roland Petit and Maurice Béjart. He then joined the Béjart Ballet Lausanne as a principal dancer and also toured extensively with the company.  Ready for a radical change, Wieland next moved to New York City, where he was awarded a scholarship to the NYU Tisch School of the Arts, earning his MFA in Contemporary Dance and Choreography in 2002. His company, johannes wieland, was founded that same year and debuted with his original work tomorrow at the Joyce SoHo theater. Praised as 'a spectacular exploration of relationships', by Anna Kisselgoff of The New York Times, this was one in the body of the startlingly powerful, terse strange pieces Wieland began creating for his company, prompting Dance Magazine to cite him as one of "25 to Watch" in 2003. From 2006 until 2021, Wieland was artistic director and choreographer of the resident dance company of the State Theater of Kassel in Germany. He was also associate artistic director of Paradigm in New York and is a guest choreographer and teacher in schools and companies in Europe and North America. He is a permanent resident of the United States and divides his time between New York and Germany.

Work
Wieland guides his dancers to achieve 'unpredictable, improbable feats and configurations' employing his riveting movement vocabulary which exhibits his architecturally driven understanding of bodies and space. The performers equally serve as conduits for the emotional atmosphere in the perilous landscape of contemporary urban life that Wieland meticulously, exhilaratingly, uninhibitedly explores in his works. The result is a richness of unconventional, explicit ideas presented with baffling technical agility and visually arresting images by his company.

As part of his integrated approach to performance art, Wieland has evolved a rigorous developmental process to explore various situations of causality. This intense process fosters an intimate and innovatingly fruitful relationship between the performers, composers, designers and other collaborating artists and institutions involved in Wieland's works.  Wieland's work also often incorporates video, text, photography, original sound scoring, set designs of an installation character. 
As part of his outreach initiative in Kassel, Wieland regularly holds open rehearsals and classes, pre- and post- performance talk-backs with the audience as well as inviting a roster of innovative choreographers to create pieces on his company.

Awards, honors and grants 
16th International Choreographic Competition in Hanover, Germany, semi-finalist, 2002
25 to Watch; Dance Magazine, 2003
Hubbard Street Choreographic Competition Winner, Chicago, 2004
Kurt Jooss Award, Germany, 2004
Goethe Institut, 2004, 2005, 2006, 2018
Harkness Foundation for Dance, 2004
 Choo-San Goh & H. Robert Magee Foundation, 2004
 Greenwall Foundation, 2004, 2005, 2006
The Guglielmo Ebreo Competition semi-finalist, Italy, 2006
Poseidon Services, 2006
 Trust for Mutual Understanding, 2007
Mid Atlantic Arts Foundation, 2007,2009
The William J. Cooper Grant, 2009
NYSCA, 2005, 2008, 2010, 2011
Der Faust, German theatre prize (nomination), 2016
Grant from the city of Kassel, Germany, 2021
Grant from the state of Hesse, Germany, 2021

Collaborations
Staatstheater Kassel (State Theater of Kassel)
Folkwang University of the Arts
Berkshire Theatre Festival
The Juilliard School
Jacob's Pillow Dance
Bard College
New York University
Ben Frost, composer
Diane von Furstenberg, fashion designer
Carmen de Lavallade, performer
Espen Sommer Eide, composer
Gus Solomons Jr., performer
Nicole Chevalier, soprano
Hans-Werner Henze, composer
Os Gêmeos, graffiti artists

References

External links
 Website, including full list of repertory
 State Theater of Kassel, in German

1967 births
German male dancers
Modern dancers
German choreographers
Living people
Dancers from Berlin
Tisch School of the Arts alumni
20th-century German dancers
21st-century German dancers